Michael McCullers (born 1971) is an American screenwriter who specializes in writing comedies.

Early life 
A native of Vestavia Hills, Alabama, McCullers attended Indian Springs School which is a private high school in Birmingham, Alabama. He was awarded a National Merit Scholarship.

Career 
McCullers began his career as a writer for Saturday Night Live. He co-wrote the scripts for Austin Powers: The Spy Who Shagged Me and Austin Powers in Goldmember, from the Austin Powers film series which stars Mike Myers. They are his best known work. 

McCullers wrote and directed the 2008 comedy Baby Mama. Tina Fey and Amy Poehler are in the film. In 1999, he signed a deal with New Line Cinema to write comedies. 

He wrote the 2017 film The Boss Baby for DreamWorks Animation, and with Genndy Tartakovsky co-wrote Hotel Transylvania 3: Summer Vacation (2018) for Sony Pictures Animation.

He will write Shrek 5 for DreamWorks Animation, and was working on the script for Frogkisser!, a live-action/animation hybrid adaptation of Garth Nix's children's book for Blue Sky Studios.

Personal life 
McCullers lives in Los Angeles with his wife and four children.

Filmography

Film

Television

References

External links

1972 births
Living people
People from Shelby County, Alabama
American male screenwriters
Screenwriters from Alabama
DreamWorks Animation people
Sony Pictures Animation people